On 19 June, 2021, a Let L-410UVP-E crashed near the Tanay Airfield. 7 occupants died, including four crew members.

Accident 
A DOSAAF L-410UVP-E3 (RF-94603), serial number 21-05 crashed on a field near Tanay Airport, Kemerovo Oblast, Russia with 19 on board of which at seven lost their lives. The aircraft was on a training flight with parachutists. During the flight, the captain had reported an engine failure and decided to return the aircraft to the airport, which during the process of turning it around, the aircraft stalled and clipped trees with its wings, then crashed.

References

2021 disasters in Russia
Accidents and incidents involving the Let L-410 Turbolet
Aviation accidents and incidents in 2021
Aviation accidents and incidents in Russia
June 2021 events in Russia